The 1921 Richmond Spiders football team was an American football team that represented the University of Richmond as a member of the South Atlantic Intercollegiate Athletic Association (SAIAA) during the 1921 college football season. Led by eighth-year head coach, Frank Dobson, Richmond compiled an overall record of 4–3–1 with a mark of 2–2–1 in conference play. 1921 was the team's final season in the SAIAA.

Schedule

References

Richmond
Richmond Spiders football seasons
Richmond Spiders football